Icon in Me (iMi) is a Russian metal band.

History 
The band formed in 2007 in Moscow. The group is composed of members Tony JJ (vocals), D.Frans (guitar), Artyom (bass) and Morten (drums). The band's debut album was released in 2009. Musicians played concerts together with well-known groups such as Machine Head and Lamb of God. Icon in me has released two albums and four singles to date.

Discography

Albums 
 Human Museum (2009)
 Head Break Solution (2011)

Singles 
 Moments (2009)
 The Quest (2011)
 Lost for Nothing (2012)
 Black Water (2013)

References 

Russian heavy metal musical groups
Musical groups from Moscow
Musical groups established in 2007
Groove metal musical groups
Metalcore musical groups
Melodic death metal musical groups